Rümmler's brush mouse or Rümmler's mouse (Coccymys ruemmleri) is a species of rodent in the family Muridae.
It is found in Indonesia and Papua New Guinea.
Its natural habitats are subtropical or tropical moist montane forests and subtropical or tropical high-altitude grassland.

References

 Baillie, J. 1996.  Coccymys ruemmleri.   2006 IUCN Red List of Threatened Species.   Downloaded on 19 July 2007.
Musser, G. G. and M. D. Carleton. 2005. Superfamily Muroidea. pp. 894–1531 in Mammal Species of the World a Taxonomic and Geographic Reference. D. E. Wilson and D. M. Reeder eds. Johns Hopkins University Press, Baltimore.

Rats of Asia
Coccymys
Endemic fauna of Papua New Guinea
Rodents of Papua New Guinea
Mammals described in 1941
Taxonomy articles created by Polbot
Rodents of New Guinea